Seychelles follows a policy of what it describes as "positive" nonalignment and strongly supports the principle of reduced superpower presence in the Indian Ocean. The Seychelles government is one of the proponents of the Indian Ocean zone of peace concept and it has promoted an end to the United States presence on Diego Garcia. The country has adopted a pragmatic policy, however, and serves as an important rest and recreation stop for US ships serving in the Persian Gulf and Indian Ocean.  Seychelles' foreign policy position has placed it generally toward the left of the spectrum within the Non-Aligned Movement. Russia, the United Kingdom, France, India, the People's Republic of China, Libya and Cuba maintain embassies in Victoria.

The government of the Seychelles withdrew diplomatic recognition of the Sahrawi Arab Democratic Republic on March 17, 2008, according to an official government source.

Bilateral relations

The Seychelles and the Commonwealth of Nations

The Seychelles is a member state of the Commonwealth of Nations.

See also

List of diplomatic missions in Seychelles
List of diplomatic missions of Seychelles

References

 
Seychelles and the Commonwealth of Nations